Karel Van Roose (born 1 April 1990 in Tielt) is a Belgian professional football midfielder who plays for SV Oostkamp.

Career
He made his debut for the first team of Cercle Brugge on 27 October 2010 in the cup match against KFC Lille, coming on as a 59th-minute substitute for Lukas Van Eenoo.

References

External links
 Karel Van Roose player info at the official Cercle Brugge site 
 

Living people
1990 births
Belgian footballers
Belgium under-21 international footballers
Cercle Brugge K.S.V. players
Association football midfielders
Belgian Pro League players
Challenger Pro League players
People from Tielt
Footballers from West Flanders